The Battle of Mount Harriet was an engagement of the Falklands War, which took place on the night of 11/12 June 1982 between British and Argentine forces. It was one of three battles in a Brigade-size operation all on the same night, the other two being the Battle of Mount Longdon and the Battle of Two Sisters.

One of a number of night battles that took place during the British advance towards Stanley, the battle led to British troops capturing all the heights above the town, allowing its capture and the surrender of the Argentine forces on the islands.

Background
The British force consisted of 42 Commando (42 CDO), Royal Marines under the command of Lieutenant Colonel Nick Vaux, Royal Marines (he later became a general), with artillery support from a battery of 29 Commando Regiment, Royal Artillery. Engineer support from 2Tp, 59 Independent Commando Squadron (59 Ind CDO Sqn), Royal Engineers. The 1st Battalion, Welsh Guards (1WG) and two companies from 40 Commando (40 CDO) were in reserve. HMS Yarmouth provided naval gunfire support.

The Argentine defenders consisted of ex-Army Green Beret Captain Carlos Alberto Arroyo's B Company from Lieutenant Colonel Diego Alejandro Soria's 4th Monte Caseros Infantry Regiment (RI 4). On 1 June, the Argentine defenders on Harriet and Two Sisters, after having abandoned their field kitchens in their original positions on Mount Challenger, were given permission by their officers to consume their cold-weather ration packs, which helped raise the morale of the conscripts.

When the Royal Marines reinforcements in the Sea Kings, and 7 'Sphinx' Battery of the 29th Commando Regiment Royal Artillery aboard a Chinook helicopter arrived at the landing zone, 3 kilometres (2 miles) behind the ridge of the mountain, they were met by gun-flashes, mortar detonations and tracer rounds as another clash involving D Squadron was taking place. Captain Gavin Hamilton's Mountain Troop had this time spotted enemy movement in the form of Captain Tomás Fernández' 2nd Assault Section, 602 Commando Company trying to exit the area after having taking cover among the boulders and caves on Bluff Cove Peak the day before.

By the end of May, D Squadron had secured Mount Kent at the cost of two wounded in Air Troop (Dick Palmer and Carl Rhodes) from small-arms fire, and Boat Troop with Tactical HQ started patrolling Bluff Cove Peak, which they took with the loss of another two SAS wounded (Ewen Pearcy and Don Masters) hit by hand grenades fragments, including a Spanish-speaking Warrant officer attached from 23 Special Air Service Regiment (Reserve) who had joined Delves to interrogate any captured Argentines. At the same time, Captain Matthew Selfridge's D Company scouting ahead of 3 PARA took Teal Inlet Settlement, at the cost of one wounded through an accidental discharge. The SAS soldiers claim coming under mortar bombardment while evacuating their wounded and the Royal Marines from 7 'Sphinx' Battery of the 29th Commando Regiment Royal Artillery reported the loss of one gunner (Van Rooyen), who suffered a broken arm while taking cover among the rocks during the bombardment.

The rest of 42 Commando made a march across the hills north of Mount Simon to reinforce Mounts Kent and Challenger overlooking Port Stanley. The weather conditions were atrocious, with the Marines advancing through steep slippery hillocks and stone-runs to their objectives. Lou Armour was a corporal in J Company under Major Mike Norman:

Because of the weather and lack of equipment, we just had to carry all our heavy equipment back to Mount Kent, instead of being flown there. That was psychologically the toughest thing I'd ever done. You're walking and falling, walking and falling—some of the lads carrying up to a hundred pounds—and if you fell over, it took two guys to lift you back up. Then there was the lack of sleep, the wet, the cold, the diarrhea.

The final attack was preceded by several days of observation and nights of patrolling. Some night-fighting patrols were part of a deception to convince the Argentines that the attack would come from a westerly direction. Other, more covert patrols were to find a route through a minefield around the south of Mount Harriet. Sniping and naval artillery were used to harass the defenders and deny them sleep.

On 3 June, Lieutenant Chris Marwood's Reconnaissance Troop of 42 CDO on Mount Wall, accompanying the 3 Commando Brigade Forward Air Control team commanded by Flight Lieutenant Dennis Marshall-Hasdell, encountered two rifle sections from the 4th Monte Caseros Regiment (Second Lieutenant Lautaro Jiménez-Corbalán's 3rd Platoon of B Company from Mount Harriet). The night before, the section under Corporal Elvio Alberto Balcaza had detected the presence of British troops on Wall, and the section under Corporal Nicolas Víctor Odorcic moved forward to assist under the cover of the early morning mist. However, at around 11.00 hours (local time) the Recce Troop opened fire and two conscripts (Privates Celso Paez and Roberto Ledesma) were instantly killed, and their NCO (Odorcic) went down, concussed when shot in the helmet by one of the Marine snipers.

This action drew attention to their exposed forward position, and Argentine reinforcements in the form of a rifle section under Corporal Walter Ariel Pintos from Second Lieutenant Marcelo Llambías Pravaz's 3rd Platoon on Two Sisters joined the action with a counterattack firing rifle-grenades. The Primary Forward Air Controller, commando-trained Flight Lieutenant Dennis Marshal-Hasdell, remembers:

We were separated from our heavy bergens with the radios and all our gear. The patrol was spread over quite a large area, with lots of shouting, noise and firing going on. The Marines abandoned all their equipment, and although no one told us, it became clear that we were to withdraw. With no information and the likelihood of having to fight our way out, Dave Greedus and I decided to abandon our equipment, destroying as much as we could. The two radio sets (HF and UHF) were tough enough, but the HAZE unit of the laser target marker was designed to withstand the weight of a tank!

The Ferranti laser-target-designator retrieved in the contact showed that the Royal Marines were seeking to destroy the Argentine bunkers on Mount Harriet with 1,000-pound GBU-16 Paveway II dropped by RAF Harriers. The next day, Lieutenant Tony Hornby's 10 (Defence) Troop re-occupied the Mount Wall observation post against no opposition. However, on the night of 5–6 June, Captain Andrés Ferrero's 3rd Assault Section attacked Lieutenant Hornby's men on Mount Wall and the Royal Marines were forced to withdraw.

That same night (5-6 June), a British Gazelle helicopter, (no. XX377 of 656 Squadron) that was bringing forward communications equipment for the advance of the 5th Infantry Brigade was shot down in friendly fire incident by a Sea Dart missile launched by HMS Cardiff, all four men in the helicopter were killed.

As a reward for their efforts, the Argentine Land Forces Commander (Brigadier-General Oscar Luis Jofre) who had been visiting the Commanding Officer of the 4th Regiment on 3 June, ordered that the recently arrived boxes of chocolate bars from the Argentine hospital ship Bahía Paraiso to be distributed among the Mount Harriet defenders, regardless of rank.<ref>Después de una visita realizada al puesto de comando del R.I. 4 ( - ) en el cerro Harriet se le hizo llegar chocolate ( venido en el Bahía Paraiso ) ; el frío era intenso y la ingestión de esas calorías ayudaría , a esos sacrificados hombres de la mesopotamia, que como todos los que estaban en las alturas quedaban frecuentemente sumergidos" en la niebla y viento. Malvinas: La Defensa de Puerto Argentino, Oscar Luis Jofre, Félix Roberto Aguiar, p. 178,Editorial Sudamaricana, 1987</ref>

Initial actions
On 8 June, the British troopships Sir Galahad and Sir Tristram were attacked by Argentine aircraft at Bluff Cove. Lieutenant-Colonel Diego Alejandro Soria sought permission to attack the British beachhead with the 4th Regiment, but his request was denied.

That day, reinforcements in the form of machine-gunners, mortarmen and protecting riflemen from the 1st 'Patricios' Infantry Regiment, Regiment of Mounted Grenadiers and 17th Airborne Infantry Regiment arrived from Comodoro Rivadavia to support the 4th Infantry Regiment. On the night of 8–9 June, action on the outer defence zone flared when Lieutenant Mark Townsend's 1 Troop (K Company, 42 CDO) probed Mount Harriet, killing two Argentines (Corporal Hipolito Gonzalez and Private Martiniano Gomez) from Second Lieutenant Jiménez-Corbalán's 3rd Platoon. At the same time, two platoon-sized fighting patrols from 45 Commando attempted the same on Two Sisters Mountain, but the Argentine RASIT ground surveillance radar on Mount Longdon was able to detect the 45 Commando platoons, and artillery fire dispersed the British force.Mayor Carlos Carrizo-Salvadores: "La noche del 8 al 9, nuevamente el Sargento Nista (operador del radar) me informó sobre la presencia del enemigo, quien estaba ubicado en el mismo lugar que la vez anterior, pero ahora, separados en grupos: a 1.500 m el primero, 2.000 m el segundo, 3.000 m el tercero y 4.000 m el cuarto, tomadas estas distancias desde la posición del radar". Martín Antonio Balza, Malvinas: Relatos de Soldados, p. 80, Círculo Militar, 1986 In all, Second Lieutenant Lautaro Jiménez-Corbalán would report the loss of 6 killed and 14 wounded fighting off Lieutenant Marwood's Recce Troop on Mount Wall and the raid of Lieutenant Towsend's 1 Troop, including losses suffered during the final British assault on Mount Harriet on the night of 11–12 June.

Around dusk on 9 June, Lieutenant-Colonel Soria's men detected the presence of British troops who had taken up positions in Port Harriet House on the southern approaches to Mount Harriet. The 4th Regiment's Reconnaissance Platoon, under Sub-Lieutenant Jorge Pasolli, received orders to move forward and clear at bayonet point if necessarythe British from the farmhouse and the Scots Guards Reconnaissance Platoon that had moved into the area was forced to withdraw when the Argentine force, with Paratroop-trained First Lieutenant Francisco Pablo D'Aloia (adjutant of RI 4's Commanding Officer) at the head, radioed fire support from the 120-mm Mortar Platoon dug in on Mount Harriet. Sub-Lieutenant Pasolli's men attacked and the Scots Guards returned fire with two Bren machine guns but were forced to abandon their rucksacks and radios."He decided to fly back the OC of the Recce Platoon from Port Harriet House. Shortly after the OC left the house the Argentinians attacked it. Several of the Recce Platoon were wounded. They had to make a run for it and left their radios and codes." The Vital Link: The Story of Royal Signals 1945-1985, Philip Warner, p. 195, Pen and Sword, 1989 As the Guardsmen retreated, under small arms and mortar fire, they sustained three wounded, including Sergeant Ian Allum.

On the night of 9-10 June, a rifle company from the 1st Battalion, 7th Duke of Edinburgh's Own Gurkha Rifles moved forward to conduct a raid against Mount William defenders. However, this strong night incursion was aborted and the planned fire support missions cancelled.At 0200 woken to find the Defensive Fire list done and just waiting for the infantry to advance. Later on the advance was cancelled, so the early hours were very quiet. Falklands Gunner, Tom Martin, Casemate Publishers, 2017
 
Over a period of a week, the 4th Regiment defended the Harriet-Two Sisters sector from five Royal Marine platoon-sized patrols. Every time the Royal Marine Commandos probed into the forward platoon positions, the officers, NCOs and conscripts, counterattacked forcing the British to withdraw.

On the morning of 11 June, the orders for the attack were given to 42 CDO by Lieutenant Colonel Vaux.  K Company was ordered to attack the eastern end of the mountain, while L Company would attack the southern side an hour later, where if the mountain was secured, would move North to occupy Goat Ridge. J Company would launch a diversionary attack (code-named Vesuvius) on the western end of Mount Harriet. If these objectives fell quickly, 42 CDO would proceed to capture Mount William.

In the closing hours of 11 June, K and L Companies moved from their assembly area on Mount Challenger (which lay to the west of Mount Harriet) and made their way south, around their objective, across the minefield, to their respective start lines. As they moved around the feature in the dark, J Company with supporting Welsh Guards launched a loud diversionary "attack" from the west.

Battle

The battle for Mount Harriet began on the evening of 11 June with a naval bombardment that killed two Argentinians and wounded twenty-five."El regimiento tuvo arriba de veinticinco heridos y dos muertos en este fuego de preparación".  Así lucharon, Carlos M. Túrolo, p. 78, Editorial Sudamericana, 1982

John Witheroe, one of the British war correspondents, later recalled the bombardment:

The Argentines retaliated and Captain Tomás Fox, the Artillery Observation Officer on Mount Kent, directed 155mm artillery rounds that fell among the men of 'B' Company, 7th Duke of Edinburgh's Own Gurkha Rifles in the area of Bluff Cove, seriously wounding four Gurkhas, including Lance Corporal Gyanendra Rai who nearly bled to death.

During the patrolling period, the Royal Marines had discovered a path through a minefield that Lieutenant Roberto Francisco Eito's platoon of sappers from the 601st Combat Engineers Company had laid around Mount Harriet, allowing the 42 Commando rifle companies to attack the two Argentine 4th Regiment companies on Harriet from the rear.

Captain Peter Babbington's K Company crossed their start line first and proceeded up the mountain undetected, knifing two sentries on the way. They remained undetected until they approached Sub-Lieutenant Mario Hector Juárez' 120 mm mortar platoon positions and decided to engage them. They were assisted in the advance by HMS Yarmouth's, artillery, and their own battalions mortars. During the engagement, Second Lieutenant Juárez was badly wounded firing his handgun in the dark and Corporal Laurence G Watts from K Company was killed clearing the occupants of a tent. The supporting British artillery batteries and mortar crews fired over 1,000 rounds to keep the Argentines pinned down, and helped stop the defenders getting a proper aim at the Royal Marines from K and L Companies.

About 150 metres from Soria's HQ, Corporal Steve Newland circled behind a group of Argentines (under First Lieutenant Jorge Agustín Echeverría, the 4th Regiment's intelligence officer) who were setting up an ambush. Newland pulled back into cover and warned the lead elements in K Company. Each time a Royal Marine moved, Corporal  Roberto Bacilio Baruzzo would open fire with the help of his night vision rifle scope, to make it appear there was only one enemy sniper holding up K Company.First Lieutenant Echeverría's men were holding their fire in order to encourage the British to break cover and rush their position only to run into the concentrated fire of the machine-gun and protecting riflemen."Every time one of ours tried to move forward, one of them would shoot at him, so to us it looked as if there was only one sniper who was keeping on the move. They were waiting for us to break cover and try and clear this one sniper - then they would just waste us with their machine-gun." The Falklands War: Then and Now, Gordon Ramsey, p. 491, After the Battle, 2009
With half a platoon of disciplined RI4 and RI12 riflemen and a 7.62 mm general-purpose machine gun team threatening the British advance, Newland darted out from cover and charged the enemy. He neutralized the machine gun with grenades but on reaching the rear of the position, Corporal Baruzzo shot Newland in both legs.

With the enemy machine gun out of action, Corporals Steve Newland, Mick Eccles and Chrystie 'Sharky' Ward were able to clear the remaining Argentine troops and captured 17 Argentines, including Baruzzo and Echeverría with the Argentinian intelligence officer having been shot five times. The three British corporals were each awarded the Military Medal.

Increasing numbers of Argentine soldiers, mainly shocked and dazed conscripts from RI 4's Recce Platoon, Reserve Platoon and 120-mm Mortar Platoon began to surrender but several experienced officers (First Lieutenants Francisco Pablo D'Aloia, Esteban Guillermo Carlucci, Luis Oscar García,  Sub-Lieutenant Jorge Pasolli and Second Lieutenant Edgardo Duarte-Lachnight)as well as the senior NCOs (including the Regimental Sergeant-Major Miguel Angel Cáceres) fought on, in accordance to their orders. The RI 4 Commanding Officer and First Lieutenant Rubén Cichiara, despite heavy British fire, linked up with B Company and ordered Arroyo's men to counterattack. The heavy machine gun teams and protecting riflemen, in general, remained at their positions continuing the fight.

Captain David Wheen's L Company crossed their start line shortly after K Company and were almost immediately engaged by machine-gun fire from Sub-Lieutenant Pablo Oliva's platoon of conscripts defending the lower southern slopes. There were several casualties from this fire, including Lieutenant Ian Stafford the only Argyll and Sutherland Highlander in the campaign who was on exchange as L Company's second -in-command and was shot in the leg.  Kim Sabido, the IRN reporter with L Company, reported stiff Argentine resistance:

The weapons in Oliva's platoon would not be silenced until being hit by several MILAN anti-tank missiles and the supporting 105mm artillery guns from Mount Challenger,"L Company's task was to clear and secure the western end of the Mount Harriet feature.  Starting after k company across the same start line, surprise had been lost and so l Company came under effective fire from heavy machine-guns within 200 metres of the start line taking three casualties almost at once. Captain Wheen, Commanding l Company, called for MILAN to fire at the machine-gun positions.". A  Rifle Company Commander's Perspective, Major David G. Wheen, Royal Marines with Oliva reporting the loss of 3 men killed (Sergeant Héctor Montellano, Corporal Oscar Labalta and Private Juan Raúl Serradori) and 14 wounded (including the platoon sergeant, Ramón Antonio Barrios and Corporals Héctor Adán Pereyra and Carlos Alberto López) in his platoon.  L Company Marines took 5 hours to advance 600 metres in the face of reinforcements in the form of Sub-Lieutenant Eugenio César Bruny's RI 4 Platoon"Era un fuego disperso totalmente, la intensidad del combate había disminuido excepto al frente, donde estaba el teniente primero Carlos Alberto Arroyo con su compañía, desde donde se escuchaba un volumen de fuego mucho mayor. Se ve que pudieron cambiar de posición, porque estaban combatiendo muy fuerte." CARLOS TUROLO, Así Lucharon, p. 214, Editorial Sudamericana and contend they took fire from at least seven machine guns and protecting rifle teams that wounded five men, including the company's second-in-command and his signaller. British military historian Hugh Bicheno reports that the 4th Regiment's passive night goggles were all with Arroyo's B Company. Another 11 Marines in Wheen's Company were wounded by Argentine shellfire that Lieutenant-Colonel Soria personally brought down attempting to halt the British advance.

Before first light, Lieutenant Jerry Burnell's 5 Troop of L Company proceeded to an outcrop of rocks towards Goat Ridge. As they advanced, the Royal Marine platoon came under fire from Second Lieutenant Jiménez-Corbalán 3rd Platoon, covering the Argentine retreat and were forced to withdraw under cover of the machine guns pre-positioned behind and further up the hill. The Troop took one casualty in this action. L Company requested mortar fire onto the Argentines; a mixture of High explosive (HE) and White phosphorus (WP); then 5 Troop moved forward supported by the 15 machine-guns positioned on the ridge. They took 3 prisoners although most of Jiménez-Corbalán men had withdrawn after losing two killed in the night fighting (Privates Juan José Acuña and Carlos Epifanio Casco). The platoon of Oscar Augusto Silva continued to resist from Goat Ridge in the early morning light and a determined conscript (Orlando Aylan), in a position just below the summit of Mount Harriet held up L Company with accurate shooting until killed by an 84mm anti-tank rocket fired at short range."One determined Argentinian sniper just below the highest part of the mountain held out long after other resistance in that area had ended. He hit 6 Troop's commander, Lieutenant Pusey, and the troop sergeant took over ...  The sniper was eventually silenced by an 84-mm Carl Gustav grenade round fired at fifteen yards range." Operation Corporate: The Falklands War, 1982, Martin Middlebrook, p.349, Viking, 1985 5 Troop continued their advance across open ground towards Goat Ridge but came under fire and withdrew into the cover of rocks. British artillery bombarded Silva's platoon and Lima Company was able to resume the advance in the form of 4 Troop and captured Goat Ridge after Silva's men had withdrawn.

At some time in the early morning darkness, Second Lieutenant Jiménez-Corbalán's 3rd platoon were making their way to new positions on Mount William, the officer was concussed and temporarily blinded when he set off an Argentine booby-trap while leading his men through a minefield. At great risk to themselves, his radio operator Privates Teodoro Flores and Carlos Salvatierra rescued their platoon commander and were decorated for their bravery.

Aftermath
The battle was an example of good planning, use of deception and surprise and was a further step towards the main objective of Stanley. Two Royal Marines, Corporal Laurence George Watts and Corporal Jeremy Smith were killed, and thirty were wounded, including fourteen in L Company. Another seven Scots Guards and Gurkhas were wounded by Argentine artillery and mortar fire controllers on Mount Harriet."The Gurkhas spent 11 June consolidating their position. This was initially under enemy 155mm shell fire that wounded four men and only slackened after counter-battery fire was directed in return." The Official History of the Falklands Campaign, Volume 2: War and Diplomacy, Lawrence Freedman, p. 525, Routledge, 2004 A supporting British Gazelle helicopter had also been lost in a friendly-fire incident early on 6 June, killing both pilots and two signallers.

Eighteen Argentines were killed defending Mount Harriet, including those killed in earlier patrol battles and shelling. The night battle had lasted longer than expected, leaving no time for 42 Commando to capture Mount William under the cover of darkness as had been planned. Lance Corporal Tony Koleszar had the surprising experience of finding that two 'dead' Argentine soldiers, whose boots he was trying to remove, were very much alive and jumped up to surrender.

Some British reporters were thus misled into depicting the Argentineans as hapless teenage conscripts who caved in after the first shots were fired, but Royal Marine Warrant Officer 2 John Cartledge, who served with L Company during the battle, corrected them, saying the Argentines were good soldiers who had fought properly:They used the tactics which they had been taught along the way very well, they were quite prepared for an attack. They put up a strong fight from start to finish. They were also better equipped than we were. We had first-generation night sights, which were large cumbersome pieces of equipment, while the Argentines had second-generation American night sights that were compact and so much better than what we had. The one deficiency which we exposed was that they had planned for a western end of the mountain attack and therefore had not bothered to extend their defensive positions to the eastern end, where we ultimately attacked.

One British general put their success down to his Marines' skill and professionalism:What was needed was speed but not being bloody stupid. The Israelis would have done it much faster but with many more casualties.

42 Commando captured 300 prisoners on Mount Harriet, and for the bravery shown in the attack, Lieutenant Colonel Nick Vaux was awarded a Distinguished Service Order, Captain Babbington of K Coy a Military Cross, Sergeant Collins, Corporals; Eccles, Newland and Ward, also of  K Coy were each awarded Military Medals.  Eight men were Mentioned in dispatches.

In 2017, David Wheen travelled to Argentina to meet Lautaro Jiménez-Corbalán, in an act of reconciliation, Wheen presented Jiménez-Corbalán with a British military essay and painting of the battle and received, in return, a copy of his book Malvinas en Primera Línea'' (Falklands on the Front Line), recounting the experiences of the 4th Regiment in the Falklands.

In 2019, Marine Andy Damstag from L Company who dragged Corporal Héctor Pereyra into the cover of rocks during the British attack and spent the next two hours looking after the wounded Argentine NCO, offering him sweets and cigarettes, contacted him and returned his helmet that he had kept as a souvenir with the help of the Argentine Embassy in London.

References

External links
 An article written by the CO of the 4th Infantry Regiment
 A 42 Commando Company Commander's perspective
 See Naval-History.Net for 42 Commando's approach to and battle for Mount Harriet
 A Brilliant Success: The Battle for Mount Harriet
 Mount Harriet: The Argentinean Story
 A British officer goes in search of 4th Regiment veterans

Conflicts in 1982
1982 in the British Empire
1982 in the Falkland Islands
Battles of the Falklands War
Battles involving the United Kingdom
Battles involving Argentina
June 1982 events in South America